The Journal of Political Ideologies is a triannual peer-reviewed academic journal covering the analysis of political ideologies. It was established by Michael Freeden and first published in 1996. Since January 2021, it has been edited by Mathew Humphrey, Professor of Political Theory at the University of Nottingham. The journal is abstracted and indexed in Scopus.

References

External links

Political science journals
Publications established in 1996
Routledge academic journals
English-language journals
Triannual journals